Pontedeva is a small municipality in Ourense in the Galicia region of north-west Spain. It is located to the very west of the province.

References  

Municipalities in the Province of Ourense